PIAA Corporation  is an automobile parts and supplies manufacturer headquartered in Bunkyō, Tokyo, Japan. It is a consolidated subsidiary of Ichikoh, which in turn is a subsidiary of Valeo. 

Despite the capitalization of its name implying that it is an acronym, it was stated in 2015 and 2019 to actually be onomatopoeia.

Motorsports
PIAA is active in supporting motorsports. It started by supplying lamps to rally teams in 1982. After that, its customer base gradually expanded, and currently, in addition to racing cars such as rally and touring cars (such as in the Nürburgring 24 Hours, Spa 24 Hours, and Fuji 24 Hours), the company also supplies racing motorcycles (such as in the Suzuka 8 Hours and FIM Endurance World Championship). Due to the high quality of its products, many teams use not only its lamps but also its water-repellent wipers, aluminum wheels, etc. for both cars and motorcycles in Japan and overseas.

Support for former racing driver Satoru Nakajima has been deeply connected since 1986. At the 1991 Japanese Grand Prix, which was Nakajima's last race at Suzuka, the Hinomaru support flag of "Thank you Satoru Nakajima" was developed. Even after he retired from active racing, PIAA continued to sponsor his Nakajima Racing team. It withdrew from sponsorship in 2009, but resumed support in 2012.

In the WRC, Toyota, Hyundai, and Citroën are supplied with PIAA lamps (and, for the former, water-repellent wipers).

References

Automotive companies based in Tokyo
Manufacturing companies based in Tokyo
Auto parts suppliers of Japan
Wheel manufacturers
Japanese brands
Manufacturing companies established in 1963
Japanese companies established in 1963